CBS Arena Football is a TV program from CBS Sports that broadcast Arena Football League games from 2013 to 2018. As part of a two-year agreement, the CBS Sports Network aired nineteen regular season games and two playoff games. When CBS aired ArenaBowl XXVI, it marked the first time since 2008 that the league's finale aired on network television.

Coverage breakdown
Regular season CBSSN broadcast games were usually on Saturday nights. As the games were shown live, the start times were not uniform as with most football broadcast packages, but varied with the time zone in which the home team was located. This meant that the AFL may have appeared either prior to or following the CBSSN's featured Major League Lacrosse game.

For the 2017 season, one AFL game per week was broadcast live nationally over CBS Sports Network. In 2017, the AFL also began streaming some games on Twitter and AFLNow, the league's streaming service.  For the 2018 season, the AFL's sole national English language telecast partner was the CBS Sports Network, but all games were streamed free online and Brigade and Valor games were available over their owner Ted Leonsis' Monumental Sports Network.

Former commentators
Sherdrick Bonner (color commentator, now with ESPN)
Andrew Catalon (play-by-play)
Randy Gatewood (sideline report)
Anthony Herron (color commentator, now with ESPN)
Ben Holden (play-by-play)
Steve Papin (sideline reporter)
Brent Stover (lead play-by-play)
Ari Wolfe (lead play-by-play, now with ESPN)

References

External links

AFL on CBS - ArenaFan.com

CBS Sports Network original programming
2013 American television series debuts
2018 American television series endings
CBS
CBS original programming
CBS Sports Spectacular
CBS Sports